Rik, Baron Jaeken (born 1949, Bocholt) is a Belgian businessman who lives in Zonhoven. He was formerly president of UNIZO (1999–2007) and was succeeded in 2007 by Flor Joosen.

Rik Jaeken is an engineer and president of a company active in selling and maintaining yachts. He is vice-president of Trias, an organization which stimulates entrepreneurship in developing countries. In addition he is a radio amateur, nickname ON1BJI, and a member of the Belgian Radio Amateur Society (UBA) section Noord-Oost Limburg (NOL, E: North-east Limburg).

Sources
Rik Jaeken 
UNIZO-Nationale Vergadering verkiest ondernemer Rik Jaeken tot nationaal voorzitter 

1949 births
Living people
Belgian businesspeople
Amateur radio people